Meletius of Constantinople may refer to:

 Meletius I of Constantinople, locum tenens of the Ecumenical Patriarchate in 1597–1598
 Meletius II of Constantinople, Ecumenical Patriarch in 1769
 Meletius III of Constantinople, Ecumenical Patriarch in 1845
 Meletius IV of Constantinople, Ecumenical Patriarch in 1921–1923